Ramchandrapur is a village in Bhatar CD block in Bardhaman Sadar North subdivision of Purba Bardhaman district in the state of West Bengal, India.

History
Census 2011 Ramchandrapur Village Location Code or Village Code 319764. The village of Ramchandrapur is located in the Bhatar tehsil of Burdwan district in West Bengal, India.

Demographics
The total geographic area of village is 451.89 hectares. Ramchandrapur features a total population of 3,221 peoples. There are about 762 houses in Ramchandrapur village. Ratanpur is nearest Village to Kumarun which is approximately 2 km away.

Caste
In Ramchandrapur village, most of the villagers are from Schedule Caste (SC). Schedule Caste (SC) constitutes 49.95% while Schedule Tribe (ST) were 1.27% of total population in Ramchandrapur village.

Population and house data

Work
In Ramchandrapur village, out of total population, 1495 were engaged in work activities. 77.99% of workers describe their work as main work (employment or earning more than 6 Months) while 22.01% were involved in marginal activity providing livelihood for less than 6 months. Of 1495 workers engaged in main work, 195 were cultivators (owner or co-owner) while 632 were agricultural labourer.

Transport 

Healthcare
Nearest Rural Hospital at Bhatar (with 60 beds) is the main medical facility in Bhatar CD block. There are primary health centres

References

External links
 Map
 Ratanpur

Villages in Purba Bardhaman district